Yueqing East railway station is a railway station on the Ningbo–Taizhou–Wenzhou railway located in Yueqing, Wenzhou, Zhejiang, China. It opened in September 2009. The station renamed from Shenfang railway station to Yueqing East railway station on November 18, 2021.

References

Railway stations in Zhejiang
Railway stations in China opened in 2009